The 2018 KBS Drama Awards, presented by Korean Broadcasting System (KBS), was held on December 31, 2018 at KBS Hall in Yeouido, Seoul. It was hosted by Jeon Hyun-moo and Uee.

Winners and nominees

Presenters

Special performances

See also
2018 MBC Drama Awards
2018 SBS Drama Awards

References

External links 
  
 

Korean Broadcasting System original programming
2018 television awards
KBS Drama Awards
2018 in South Korea
December 2018 events in South Korea